Bernd Drogan (born 26 October 1955) is a retired  East German cyclist who was active between 1971 and 1987. In 1979 he won a gold and a bronze medal in the road race at the World Cycling Championships, with the German team and individually. Next year he won a silver medal in the 100 km team time trial at the 1980 Summer Olympics.

He won a gold medal in the 100 km team time trial at the 1981 UCI Road World Championships, and next year finished as the world champion in the individual road race. He missed the 1984 Summer Olympics due to their boycott by East Germany and competed at the Friendship Games instead, winning a gold medal in the road race.

During his career, Drogan won several major road races, including those of Circuit de la Sarthe (1978), Around the Hainleite (1982) and Tour de Slovaquie (1983). He was twice chosen the German Sportspersonality of the Year, in 1979 and 1982. He also had to cope with many setbacks: in 1975 he had blood poisoning after a fall at the national championships. In 1978, he broke a collarbone just before the start of the Peace Race. He also given up several major races due to bad falls on the road.

After retiring from competitions in 1985 he worked as a cycling coach and an accountant.

References

External links

Bernd Drogan. munzinger.de

1955 births
Living people
People from Spree-Neiße
People from Bezirk Cottbus
East German male cyclists
Olympic silver medalists for East Germany
Olympic cyclists of East Germany
Cyclists at the 1980 Summer Olympics
Cyclists from Brandenburg
UCI Road World Champions (elite men)
Medalists at the 1980 Summer Olympics
Olympic medalists in cycling